Bisheh Kola or Bisheh Kala may refer to:
 Bisheh Kola, Mahmudabad
 Bisheh Kola, Sari